Baptiste Santamaria (born 9 March 1995) is a French professional footballer who plays as a midfielder for Ligue 1 club Rennes.

Club career
Santamaria is a youth exponent from Tours. He made his Ligue 2 debut on 18 October 2013 against CA Bastia replacing Bryan Bergougnoux after 88 minutes in a 2–1 away win at the Stade Armand Cesari.

On 25 June 2016, Santamaria joined Ligue 1 side Angers after a transfer fee offer of €400,000 from Angers to Tours had previously been rejected by the latter.

In September 2020, Santamaria moved to Bundesliga club SC Freiburg after protracted negotiations with Angers. German sports magazine kicker reported the transfer fee as "about €10 million", the highest in SC Freiburg's history.

On 17 August 2021, Santamaria transferred to Ligue 1 club Rennes for a reported fee of €14 million.

Career statistics

References

External links
 Freiburg profile
 
 

Living people
1995 births
Association football midfielders
French footballers
France youth international footballers
Tours FC players
Angers SCO players
SC Freiburg players
Stade Rennais F.C. players
Ligue 1 players
Ligue 2 players
Bundesliga players
French expatriate footballers
French expatriate sportspeople in Germany
Expatriate footballers in Germany
French people of Spanish descent
Sportspeople from Cher (department)
Footballers from Centre-Val de Loire